Filippo Romagna (born 26 May 1997) is an Italian professional footballer who plays as centre-back for Italian Serie A club Sassuolo.

Club career

Early career
Born in 1997, Romagna started his football career with the local team in his hometown, Fano. At the age of 10, Romagna moved to Rimini. In 2011, Internazionale tried to sign with Romagna but he eventually joined Juventus F.C. Youth Sector. During his stay within Juventus academy, he became also captain of the Under-19 team, which plays in Campionato Nazionale Primavera.

Juventus

Loan to Novara and Brescia
On 29 August 2016, he was loaned to Serie B club Novara until the end of 2016–17 season. On 22 October, he made his professional and league debut against at Stadio Silvio Piola, replacing Gianluca Sansone in the 79th minute of a 1–0 home win over Avellino. On 29 November. Romagna played in the fourth round of Coppa Italia in a 3–0 away defeat against ChievoVerona, he played the full match. Romangna ended his loan with only five appearances. In January he was recall to the first team.

In January 2017 he was sent on loan to Serie B club Brescia, in order to find more playing time. He made his debut with Brescia on 24 February 2017, in the league match won 4–1 against Cittadella. Romagna ended his six-month loan to Brescia with 14 appearances, all as a starter.

Cagliari
On 28 July 2017, Cagliari confirmed the signing of Romagna on a five-year contract. On 17 September he made his debut for Cagliari in Serie A as a substitute, replacing Joao Pedro in the 91st minute of 2–0 away win over SPAL.

Loan to Sassuolo
On 2 September 2019, Romagna joined Sassuolo on loan until 30 June 2020.

Sassuolo
On 17 September 2020, Romagna signed to Sassuolo.

International career
Romagna has represented his country at various age groups. On 19 October 2013, he was first called up and played for Italy U17 against Ukraine U17. With the Italy U19 he took part at the 2016 UEFA European Under-19 Championship, playing five games in the tournament, Italy finishing the competition as a runners-up.

With the Italy U20 he took part at the 2017 FIFA U-20 World Cup.

He made his debut with the Italy U21 team on 1 September 2017, in a friendly match lost 3–0 against Spain.

Career statistics

Club

Honours
Italy U20
FIFA U-20 World Cup bronze medals: 2017

References

Living people
1997 births
People from Fano
Association football central defenders
Italian footballers
Italy under-21 international footballers
Italy youth international footballers
Serie A players
Serie B players
Juventus F.C. players
Novara F.C. players
Brescia Calcio players
Cagliari Calcio players
U.S. Sassuolo Calcio players
Sportspeople from the Province of Pesaro and Urbino
Footballers from Marche